"Promises" is a single released by the British rock musician Eric Clapton in September 1978. It is part of his studio album Backless.

Release
"Promises" was released as a 7-inch vinyl single in the United States, Canada, Netherlands, Belgium, Germany, Australia, France, Spain, the United Kingdom and Italy in September 1978. With the age of digital music, the song is available as a digital music download in nearly every country. Besides being released as a single, the track appears on various compilation albums including Timepieces: The Best of Eric Clapton (1982), Backtrackin' (1984), The Cream of Eric Clapton (1987), Crossroads (1988), The Cream of Clapton (1995) and Complete Clapton (2007). In total, the title has been released on over 15 albums.

Chart performance 
The release was especially successful in the United States reaching No.9 on the Billboard Hot 100 singles chart, as well as peaking at No.6 on the magazine's Adult Contemporary chart. It also reached position 82 on the Top Country Singles chart. The b-side, "Watch Out for Lucy" was subsequently promoted to radio reaching No.40 on the Hot 100 singles chart. In Canada, the single ranked at 7 on the national singles chart and reached No.24 on the Canadian Adult Contemporary chart. Additionally, it charted up to position 12 on the CHUM charts in Canada. In New Zealand, a re-entry reached No.35 on the country's official music chart. In the Netherlands, "Promises" reached No.40 on the Top 100 singles chart and stayed on the list for seven weeks. It also reached position 3 on the Dutch Top 40 "tip parade" (songs bubbling under the main Top 40). In France, the album was listed under the artist name "Eric Clapton & His Band" and peaked at No.71. In Australia the song peaked at No.26, although in the United Kingdom it only made No.37. In Norway, the release peaked at No.1 on the Country Singles chart, which had been introduced that year and was removed from the VG-lista in 1980.

Composition and critical reception
"Promises" consists of four verses, two choruses and one outro. The song is in the key of G major and backing vocals were performed by Marcy Levy.  Billboard called "Promises" a "swaying, melodic rocker" that sometimes sounds like Clapton's earlier hit "Lay Down Sally." Record World said that it "is largely acoustic with smooth and easy vocals."  AllMusic critic William Ruhlmann calls the song an "understated pop shuffle" and notes the writing credits of Richard Feldman and Roger Linn. Ruhlmann then goes on to criticize that Backless and the song "Promises" are not "memorable recordings" of Clapton. The German music journalist Steffen Greifswald writes in his review for the Frankfurter Allgemeine Zeitung: "Backless is a good recording for music lovers and of course Eric Clapton fanatics. One recording definitely sticks out – the song "Promises" has integrity, soul and passion. The track therefore perfectly sums up Eric Clapton and his work".

Chart history

Weekly charts

Year-end charts

References

Eric Clapton songs
RSO Records singles
1978 songs
1978 singles
1970s ballads
Rock ballads